Gomer Hughes (13 May 1910 – ) was a Welsh dual-code international rugby union, and professional rugby league footballer who played in the 1930s and 1940s.

Background
Hughes was born in Neath, Glamorgan, and he died aged 64 in Salford, Greater Manchester, England.

Playing career

International honours
Gomer Hughes represented Wales XV (RU) while at Swinton (RL) in the 'Victory International' non-Test match(es) between December 1945 and April 1946, won 3 caps for Wales (RU) in 1935–1940 while at Penarth RFC (RU) in 1934 England, Scotland, and Ireland, and won caps for Wales (RL) while at Swinton (RL).

Six rugby league footballers represented Wales XV (RU) while at rugby league clubs, they were; Tyssul Griffiths, Elwyn Gwyther, Gomer Hughes, Hugh Lloyd-Davies, Harold Thomas and Leslie Thomas.

Gomer Hughes, and Harold Thomas had previously won Wales (RU) caps, but the other footballers hadn't, and having already changed to the rugby league code they were unable to do so, but Tyssul Griffiths, Elwyn Gwyther, Leslie Thomas, did go on to win Wales (RL) caps.

References

External links
History of Penarth RFC
(archived by web.archive.org) Welsh stars still had a rugby ball in wartime

1910 births
1974 deaths
Dual-code rugby internationals
Penarth RFC players
Rugby league props
Rugby league second-rows
Rugby union locks
Rugby league players from Neath
Swinton Lions players
Wales international rugby union players
Wales national rugby league team players
Welsh rugby league players
Welsh rugby union players
Rugby union players from Neath